The 2013–14 season of the División de Plata de Balonmano is the 20th season of second-tier handball in Spain.

Regular season started in September 2013 and finished on 10 May, 2014. After completing 30 matchdays, top team is promoted to Liga ASOBAL, and teams qualified 2nd, 3rd, 4th and 5th play the promotion playoff.

FC Barcelona B was the champion team, but due to its reserve status, they can't promote to Liga ASOBAL. Next team in standings (2nd), MMT Seguros Zamora, was promoted to Liga ASOBAL.

Competition rules 

The championship consist of 16 teams playing each other twice for a total of 30 matchdays. At end of regular season, the top team in the standings is promoted to Liga ASOBAL. Teams in 2nd, 3rd, 4th and 5th place play the promotion playoff for a single spot in Liga ASOBAL. Bottom  team is relegated to Primera División Estatal while teams in 13th, 14th and 15th play the relegation playoff.

Points during regular season are awarded as following;

Each victory adds 2 points to the winner team.

Each drawn adds 1 point to each team.

Promotion and relegation 
Once finished 2013–14 regular season.

Teams promoted to Liga ASOBAL 2014–15
MMT Seguros Zamora – 2nd at standings
Servigroup Benidorm – via playoffs

Teams relegated to 2014–15 Primera Nacional
Ereintza Aguaplast

Teams

Regular season standings

Promotion playoff

Winner of Final will be promoted to Liga ASOBAL for 2014–15 season.
Host team: Alcobendas
City: Alcobendas, Community of Madrid
Venue: Pabellón de los Sueños and Pabellón Amaya Valdemoro
Date: 24–25 May 2014

Bracket

Semifinals

Third place

Final

Relegation round

Two last teams in the table will be relegated to Primera División for 2014–15 season.
Host team: Pozoblanco
City: Pozoblanco, Andalusia
Venue: Pabellón Municipal Juan Sepúlveda
Date: 23–25 May 2014

Standings

Matches

Top goal scorers

References

External links
Regular season standings
Promotion playoffs and relegation round schedule 

División de Plata de Balonmano seasons
2013–14 in Spanish handball